Sinop is an impact crater on Mars.  It lies southeast of Tyrrhenus Mons on Hesperia Planum.

It was named by the IAU in 1991 after the town of Sinop in Turkey.

The ejecta of Sinop is indistinct compared to nearby craters Arica and Boulia, which are both rampart craters.

References 

Impact craters on Mars